Manchester is the third full-length album by Tim Barry.

Track listing
 "Texas Cops" – 2:13
 "On And On" – 2:40
 "South Hill" – 3:54
 "5 Twenty 5" – 4:10
 "This November" – 2:28
 "Sagacity Gone" – 2:57
 "Ronnie Song" – 3:15
 "C.R.F. (Retired)" – 2:51
 "Tacoma" – 3:43
 "Tile Work" – 2:23
 "222" – 4:15
 "Raised And Grown" – 4:03

2008 albums
Tim Barry albums